Tilbe Şenyürek (born 26 April 1995) is a Turkish professional basketball player for AZS AJP Gorzów Wielkopolski.

See also
Turkish women in sports

References

External links
Profile at tbf.org.tr

1995 births
Living people
People from Seyhan
Power forwards (basketball)
Turkish women's basketball players
Botaş SK players
Centers (basketball)
Fenerbahçe women's basketball players
Basketball players at the 2016 Summer Olympics
Olympic basketball players of Turkey